BioCity Nottingham is a bioscience science park in central Nottingham in the United Kingdom. It is the UK's largest bioscience innovation and incubation centre.

History
In 2002, laboratories and office space were donated to Nottingham Trent University by BASF. Biocity was founded in September 2003 by the University of Nottingham, Nottingham Trent University (NTU) and the East Midlands Development Agency (which was based close to BioCity).

Biocity's premises were developed from the building donated by BASF. Phase 1 was completed in March 2004, providing  of space, then Phase 2 in March 2006 provided .

Background
Nottingham has a history of bioscience research done at the University of Nottingham, Nottingham Trent University and by Boots, Britain's largest retail pharmacy company, which is based in Dunkirk/Beeston.

Although Boots no longer engages in drug discovery, Ibuprofen (iso-butyl-propanoic-phenolic acid) was created by a team of Boots scientists including Stewart Adams and  John Nicholson. In November 2013 work on ibuprofen was recognised by the erection of a Royal Society of Chemistry blue plaque on the site of the original laboratory where the painkiller was developed. The plaque reads:

In March 2005 Nottingham was named as a Science City; the other 5 Science Cities were Birmingham, Bristol, York, Newcastle and Manchester.

Structure
It is situated in former BASF buildings, which previously were used by Boots as research laboratories. The site on Pennyfoot Street, between the A60 and A612, is for bioscience SMEs. The University of Nottingham has the largest collaboration with companies at BioCity, with a few having links with NTU.

There are three buildings –
 Innovation Centre Building
 Stewart Adams Building – named after Dr Stewart Adams OBE, who led the team at Boots (with John Nicholson) that discovered Ibuprofen, a non-steroidal anti-inflammatory drug, in 1963
 Laurus Building

In January 2012 BioCity opened a second site, BioCity Scotland, resulting from the acquisition of a former MSD research facility near Glasgow.

See also
 Sheffield Bioincubator
 London Bioscience Innovation Centre
 Francis Crick Institute
 Creative Quarter, Nottingham

References

External links
 BioCity Nottingham
 Science City Nottingham 
 UKSPA
 NTU
 CPMG Architects - Discovery Building at BioCity

News items
 Laurus Building opens in October 2008

Video clips
 Glen Crocker
 Nottingham Science – Laurus Building

2003 establishments in the United Kingdom
Biology organisations based in the United Kingdom
Buildings and structures in Nottingham
Business incubators of the United Kingdom
Organisations based in Nottingham
Organizations established in 2003
Pharmaceutical industry in the United Kingdom
Pharmaceutical research institutes
Nottingham Trent University
Science and technology in Nottinghamshire
Science parks in the United Kingdom
University of Nottingham